Arhopala eurisus is a butterfly in the family Lycaenidae. It was described by Hamilton Herbert Druce in 1891. It is found in the Australasian realm (St. Matthias island group, Bismarck Archipelago, Witu Island, Solomon Islands and the New Hebrides).

Subspecies
Arhopala eurisus eurisus
Arhopala eurisus tovesi Tennent, 1999 (Solomon Islands)

References

External links

Arhopala
Butterflies described in 1891
Butterflies of Oceania
Taxa named by Hamilton Herbert Druce